Gustaf Henrik Wilhelm Gyllenram was a Swedish military general, politician, and civil servant. He was the father of Henric Fredric Gyllenram.

Biography
Gyllenram was the son of Major Bernhard Fredrik Gyllenram and his wife Countess Beata Christina Lovisa Douglas of the Douglas family. He was married in 1840 with Ebba Augusta Arnell.

Gyllenram became second lieutenant of the Second Life Grenadier Regiment in 1833, lieutenant in 1846, captain in 1854, major in 1858, lieutenant colonel in 1862, colonel in the Army in 1862, military commander and head of the Gotland National Conscription in 1862-73 and Major General in 1863. He was also the Governor of Gotland County from 1862 to 1873 and in Värmland County 1873–1885.

Gyllenram participated in the Riksdag negotiations during the term of office as a self-appointed member of the knighthood and nobility at the Riksdags in 1853–1854, 1856–1858, 1862–1863 and 1865–1866. In the years 1866–1874, he sat in the first chamber of the Riksdag, elected by the Gotland County Council. In the years 1885–1888, he belonged to the same chamber, but was elected by the Värmland County Council.

References

1814 births
1890 deaths
Governors of Gotland
Swedish Army major generals
Swedish nobility
19th-century Swedish politicians